Kluknava is a village and municipality in the Gelnica District in the Košice Region of eastern Slovakia. In 2011 had been total municipality population 1604 inhabitants.

See also
 List of municipalities and towns in Slovakia

References

Genealogical resources

The records for genealogical research are available at the state archive "Statny Archiv in Levoca, Slovakia"

 Roman Catholic church records (births/marriages/deaths): 1722-1918 (parish A)

The genealogy of several families including The Terpak and Vascak surnames can be found at *Official homepage Official homepage

External links
http://en.e-obce.sk/obec/kluknava/kluknava.html
Official homepage
Surnames of living people in Kluknava

Villages and municipalities in Gelnica District